Sergio Hidalgo Paredes is a contemporary artist from Barcelona known as Sixe art or Sixeart. He was a graffiti artist in Barcelona;  in the late 1980s he started painting. In 2008 he was one of the six artists invited to paint the river façade of the Tate Modern in London.

Exhibitions 

 Truck Art Project. - Madrid, España, 2016.

References

Further reading 
 Catálogo Sixeart & Raúl de Dios (2007) Publicación de N2 Galería
 Catálogo De Chillida a Sixeart. Obra tridimensional (2009) Manel Mayoral.
 Sixeart, Mundo Animal, ROJO SPECIAL EDITION. 
 Nguyen, Patrick; Mackenzie, Stuart (2010) Beyond the street, Gestalten, Berlin. p. 154-155 
 Lewisohn, Cedar, Street Art (2008), Tate Publishing, London. p. 14,69

External links 
 Sixeart Official Website
  Video Youtube - Interview (in Catalan)
 El Equipo Plástico Official Website
  "Sixeart Gives Graffiti Style a Museum Quality" The Wall Street Journal
  "Grafitis barceloneses en la fachada de la Tate Modern de Londres" El Mundo
 "El español Sixeart - La Tate de Londres dignifica el graffiti" El Pais

Spanish graffiti artists
Living people
1975 births